Fourou is a town and rural commune in the Cercle of Kadiolo in the Sikasso Region of southern Mali near the border with Ivory Coast. The commune covers an area of 1,334 square kilometers and includes the town and 22 villages. In the 2009 census it had a population of 40,826. The town of Fourou, the administrative center (chef-lieu) of the commune, is 47 km northwest of Kadiolo.

References

External links
.

Communes of Sikasso Region